Catharine Pendrel (born September 30, 1980) is a Canadian cross-country mountain biker from Fredericton, New Brunswick. A member of the Canadian National team since 2004, Pendrel was the world champion in cross-country mountain biking in 2011 and 2014 and the 2007 Pan American Games champion. She is also the current reigning Commonwealth Games champion when she won gold in Glasgow. Additionally, Pendrel is the 2010 World Cup Champion as well as the winner of the 2012 UCI and 2016 World Cup Series. She won a bronze medal at the 2016 Summer Olympics in Rio de Janeiro.

Career
Pendrel was a competitive horse rider in eventing prior to selecting mountain biking as her primary sport. Her brother Geoff Pendrel is an elite downhill mountain bike racer. He introduced her to the sport as a child through the trails he built on their horse farm. Pendrel's first race was on a bike borrowed from her brother. She noted that she got into mountain biking because she "sucked at all the school sports." She recounts that her first rides on her bike were often quite nervous ones ruled by fear, especially on descents where she would walk her bike down, she said that "what I remember from starting is falling and crashing a lot."

She then headed from the East Coast to the West Coast where she began riding at the University of Victoria. There she had to convince future coach Dan Proulx into taking her on, as he was quoted "Catharine and I often joke because, no, I didn't see (world champion potential) in her at first. It took a lot of persistence and hard work over time. She had to bug me a bit to get me to coach her at first and luckily it all worked out. It just goes to show you, you can work hard and make something happen."

Olympic disappointment
Her first international competition was at the 2004 World Championships in Les Gets, France where she finished 46th. Prior to competing at the 2008 Summer Olympics, Pendrel competed at the 2007 Pan Am Games where she won gold. She finished 4th at the 2008 Beijing Olympics in the cross-country event just 9 seconds out of a medal position. Pendrel was not as notable a rider at the time as her hero, teammate, and gold medal favourite Marie-Hélène Prémont who did not finish after a lingering and unknown illness caused her to retire from the race.

This near Olympic success helped launch Pendrel's most successful period. She won the 2010 UCI World Cup Series before winning the 2011 World Championships. These achievements put her as one of Canada's top medal favourites for the 2012 Summer Olympics. In advance of the London games, she had won an online fan poll to be selected as Canada's flag bearer, though the Canadian Olympic Committee eventually selected Simon Whitfield as the flag bearer. In response she tweeted "Thank you Canada & cycling fans for voting me as people's choice for flag bearer. You honor and inspire me!" She was also put into a favoured position to win at the London Olympics by winning the test event prior to the games. At the Olympics Pendrel finished back in 9th place, disappointing the high expectations of her. After the race a tearful Pendrel said that "I felt so strong yesterday and today just didn't happen. You know I'm sorry because I know everyone in B.C. got up at 4:30 [a.m.] to watch me. It's just what I had in the day and unfortunately this only comes every four years. Maybe in Rio."

Commonwealth and Pan Am success

Pendrel followed up Olympic disappointment with a great result in her next major multi-sport event the 2014 Commonwealth Games in Glasgow. There she won the gold medal in the women's mountain bike event while teammate Emily Batty followed her for a Canadian one-two finish on the podium.  She then took her second World Championship title that September in Hafjell, Norway.

At the 2015 Pan American Games in Toronto Pendrel and Batty again battled for the top podium spot with the two Canadians taking an early lead on the same course they had raced in 2014 Nationals competition. This time it was Silver for Pendrel and gold for Emily Batty.

2016 Olympic success at last
Pendrel met cycling Canada's automatic selection Criteria to represent Canada at the Olympic Games in Rio de Janeiro in 2016, and she did participate as part of Canada's Olympic team. At the mountain bike event she crashed early on one of the first turns but would battle back into the main chase pack, together with Emily Batty and would later pull away in the third position, holding it for the bronze medal over Batty. After Pendrel described the race saying "It's unbelievable. Before the race I would have been happy with my career if I didn't have an Olympic medal, but I'm sure happy that I do. At the beginning of the race with getting in a crash at the start and then my shifting stopped working and it was just like: 'Everything is going wrong. I'm used to having bad starts, luckily, and I know I can work through a field. We had prepared for every scenario. I knew that I could close a gap and that's what I set about doing today." Two weeks after the Games she won her third overall World Cup title.

2020 Olympics
In July 2021, Pendrel was named to Canada's 2020 Olympic team, just seven months after giving birth.

Honours
In 2012 Pendrel was awarded the Queen Elizabeth II Diamond Jubilee Medal.

Personal
She was born in Fredericton, New Brunswick, and grew up outside the small community of Harvey Station, New Brunswick. Listed as her personal heroes are Gunn-Rita Dahle and Marie-Hélène Prémont.

References

External links

Cycling Canada National Team Members (2015)

1980 births
Living people
Canadian female cyclists
Cross-country mountain bikers
Olympic cyclists of Canada
Cyclists at the 2007 Pan American Games
Cyclists at the 2008 Summer Olympics
Cyclists at the 2012 Summer Olympics
Cyclists at the 2016 Summer Olympics
Sportspeople from British Columbia
Sportspeople from Fredericton
Cyclists at the 2015 Pan American Games
Pan American Games gold medalists for Canada
Pan American Games silver medalists for Canada
Commonwealth Games gold medallists for Canada
Cyclists at the 2014 Commonwealth Games
UCI Mountain Bike World Champions (women)
Canadian mountain bikers
Olympic bronze medalists for Canada
Olympic medalists in cycling
Medalists at the 2016 Summer Olympics
Commonwealth Games medallists in cycling
Pan American Games medalists in cycling
Medalists at the 2007 Pan American Games
Medalists at the 2015 Pan American Games
Cyclists at the 2020 Summer Olympics
Medallists at the 2014 Commonwealth Games